Neidalia cerdai is a moth of the family Erebidae first described by Hervé de Toulgoët in 1997. It is found in French Guiana.

References

 

Phaegopterina
Moths described in 1997